The 2015 Ando Securities Open was a professional tennis tournament played on outdoor hard courts. It was the first edition of the tournament and part of the 2015 ITF Women's Circuit, offering a total of $100,000 in prize money. It took place in Ariake, Tokyo, Japan, on 16–22 November 2015.

Singles main draw entrants

Seeds 

 1 Rankings as of 9 November 2015.

Other entrants 
The following players received wildcards into the singles main draw:
  Mai Minokoshi
  Miki Miyamura
  Akiko Omae
  Yuuki Tanaka

The following players received entry from the qualifying draw:
  Shiho Akita
  Akari Inoue
  Cristina Sánchez Quintanar
  Aiko Yoshitomi

The following players received entry by a lucky loser spot:
  Yuka Higuchi
  Mari Osaka

Champions

Singles

 Zhang Shuai def.  Nao Hibino, 6–4, 6–1

Doubles

 Shuko Aoyama /  Makoto Ninomiya def.  Eri Hozumi /  Kurumi Nara, 3–6, 6–2, [10–7]

External links 
 2015 Ando Securities Open at ITFtennis.com
 

 
2015 ITF Women's Circuit
2015 in Japanese tennis